Lesya Mykhailivna Kalytovska (13 February 1988 in Lviv Oblast, Soviet Union) is a Ukrainian professional racing cyclist. At the 2008 Summer Olympics, she competed in the women's points race, and the women's individual pursuit, winning a bronze medal in the later.  At the 2012 Summer Olympics, she competed in the Women's team pursuit for the national team.

Career highlights

2005
3rd, European Championship, Road, ITT, Juniors, Moscow
1st, European Championship, Track, Pursuit, Juniors, Fiorenzuola
1st, World Championship, Track, Pursuit, Juniors, Wien
2006
1st, European Championship, Track, Pursuit, Juniors, Athens
1st, World Championship, Track, Pursuit, Juniors, Ghent
2nd, World Championship, Road, ITT, Juniors, Spa-Francorchamps
2nd, World Cup, Track, Scratch, Moscow
2007
1st, European Championship, Track, Pursuit, U23, Cottbus
3rd, World Cup, Track, Team Pursuit, Sydney
1st, World Cup, Track, Team Pursuit, Beijing
2008
1st, World Cup, Track, Pursuit, Los Angeles
1st, World Cup, Track, Team Pursuit, Los Angeles
2nd, European championships, road race, Under 23
3rd, European championships, time trial, Under 23
Olympic Bronze medal, Individual Pursuit, Beijing
2nd Team Pursuit, 2008 UCI Track Cycling World Championships
2009
3rd Individual pursuit, Track Cycling World Cup, Melbourne
UEC European U23 Track Championships
1st  Team Pursuit (with Svitlana Galyuk and Anna Nagirna)
2nd Individual Pursuit
3rd Points Race
2010
3rd Individual pursuit, Track Cycling World Cup, Beijing

References

External links
 

1988 births
Living people
Ukrainian female cyclists
Ukrainian track cyclists
Olympic cyclists of Ukraine
Cyclists at the 2008 Summer Olympics
Cyclists at the 2012 Summer Olympics
Olympic bronze medalists for Ukraine
Olympic medalists in cycling
Medalists at the 2008 Summer Olympics
Universiade medalists in cycling
Universiade silver medalists for Ukraine
Medalists at the 2011 Summer Universiade
Sportspeople from Lviv Oblast
20th-century Ukrainian women
21st-century Ukrainian women